Attila Hajdu (born 13 April 1971) is a Hungarian football player.

He spent most of his career playing for clubs in Hungary, but also had a spell with SC Fortuna Köln in the German 2. Bundesliga.

Honours
Ferencvárosi TC
 Nemzeti Bajnokság I: 1995–96; runners-up: 1997–98

MTK Hungária FC
 Nemzeti Bajnokság I: 2002–03
 Szuperkupa: 2003

Individual
Goalkeeper of the Year: 1995–96

References

External links

Living people
1971 births
Hungarian footballers
Hungary international footballers
MTK Budapest FC players
SC Fortuna Köln players
2. Bundesliga players
Association football goalkeepers
Footballers from Budapest